Sadie Isabelle Amy Miller (born 25 February 1985) is an English actress and author. She is known for her portrayal of Natalie Redfern in the Sarah Jane Smith audio drama series by Big Finish, her novel, Moon Blink, from Candy Jar Books's series, Lethbridge-Stewart, as well as her association with the science fiction series, Doctor Who. She is the daughter of actors Brian Miller and Elisabeth Sladen.

Biography and career
As a child, Miller did extensive voice work. At eight years old, she made her TV debut as Penny, the on-screen daughter of Minnie Driver's character, Sally, in the BBC Screen One film Royal Celebration. She appeared alongside her mother in the retrospective documentary Doctor Who: Thirty Years in the TARDIS (1993), wearing a replica of her mother's  "Andy Pandy" striped dungarees from the Doctor Who serial, The Hand of Fear (1976). She also played Natalie Redfern in both series of Sarah Jane Smith for Big Finish Productions in 2002 and 2006, and wrote several monologues for her mother on the audio,"The Actor Speaks".

In the early 2010s, Miller wrote several short stories, novellas, novels, and poems for several magazines and other publishings, such as Aurum Press, and The Oddville Press. She was met with moderately positive receptions from local newspapers: Sadie's short story, "Scarborough in July", as a part of the short stories collection, 'Beside the Seaside', compiled by Scott Harrison, has been described as "a bittersweet tale of loss, love and loneliness among the vacationing crowds", according to the Telegraph & Argus.

In April 2016, Miller published her debut novel as the first book of the second series of the Lethbridge-Stewart novels, Moon Blink, under the publishing house, Candy Jar Books. She explained her comeback from her association with Doctor Who, as an author: "...I feel that the time is right to reconnect with Doctor Who, and the fans. My dad did so last year with an appearance in Peter Capaldi’s first episode, and so now it’s my turn."

In 2021 Miller took over for her mother in the role of Sarah Jane Smith for the Doctor Who Big Finish Productions audio dramas, first with Tom Baker as the fourth Doctor in Return of the Cybermen, then with Tim Treloar as the third Doctor in The Third Doctor Adventures.

Personal life
Miller completed courses with the National Youth Theatre, the Royal Court Theatre's Young Writer's Programme, and RADA's Shakespeare Course. She earned a BA in English and Related Literature, graduated with honours, and continues to act and write.

According to her mother's autobiography, she was due to be born on her mother's 39th birthday, 1 February 1985.

She gave birth to her first son, Theodore Brian Thomas on 25 June 2016. Her second son, Valentine Heath Reginald was born on her father's birthday, 17 April 2019.

References

External links

1985 births
Living people
English television actresses
English writers
People from Hammersmith
English women writers
National Youth Theatre members